was a feudal domain under the Tokugawa shogunate of the Edo period, located in, Kazusa Province (modern-day Chiba Prefecture), Japan. The domain was centered on what is now the city of Ichihara, Chiba. It was ruled for the entirety of its history by a branch of the Arima clan. The site of the Goi Domain jin'ya is now Goi Station on the JR-East Uchibō Line.

History
Goi Domain was created on November 28, 1781, when Arima Ujiyoshi, the daimyō of Nishijo Domain in Ise Province relocated his jin'ya from Ise to Kazusa. He died two years later, at the age of 23, and his successors likewise had unusually short lifespans. His son Ujiyasu died at the age of 29, successor Hiroyasu at age 35 and son Ujisada at age 24. The 5th daimyō of Goi Domain, Arima Ujishige, decided to relocate his residence to Fukiage Domain in Kōzuke Province on April 17, 1842, and Goi Domain was thus dissolved.

As with most domains in the han system, Goi Domain consisted of several discontinuous territories calculated to provide the assigned kokudaka, based on periodic cadastral surveys and projected agricultural yields.

List of daimyō
  Arima clan (fudai) 1781-1842

References

Bolitho, Harold (1974). Treasures among men; the fudai daimyo in Tokugawa Japan. New Haven: Yale University Press.
Kodama Kōta 児玉幸多, Kitajima Masamoto 北島正元 (1966). Kantō no shohan 関東の諸藩. Tokyo: Shin Jinbutsu Ōraisha.

External links
Genealogy of the lords of Goi

Notes

Domains of Japan
1781 establishments in Japan
States and territories established in 1781
1842 disestablishments in Japan
States and territories disestablished in 1842
Kazusa Province
History of Chiba Prefecture